The 2015 Girls' Youth European Volleyball Championship was played in Samokov and Plovdiv, Bulgaria from March 28 to April 5, 2015. The top six teams qualified for the 2015 Youth World Championship.

Participating teams
 Host
 
 Qualified through 2015 Girls' Youth European Volleyball Championship Qualification

Pool composition

Squads

Pool standing procedure
 Match points
 Numbers of matches won
 Sets ratio
 Points ratio
 Result of the last match between the tied teams

Match won 3–0 or 3–1: 3 match points for the winner, 0 match points for the loser
Match won 3–2: 2 match points for the winner, 1 match point for the loser

Preliminary round
All times are Eastern European Summer Time (UTC+03:00) except 28 March is Eastern European Time (UTC+02:00).

Pool I
venue:  Arena Samokov, Samokov, Bulgaria

|}

|}

Pool II
venue:  University Sport Hall Plovdiv, Plovdiv, Bulgaria

|}

|}

Final round
All times are Eastern European Summer Time (UTC+03:00).
venue:  University Sport Hall Plovdiv, Plovdiv, Bulgaria

5th–8th place

5th–8th place playoff

|}

7th place

|}

5th place

|}

Final round

Semifinal

|}

3rd place

|}

Final

|}

Final standing

Awards

Most Valuable Player
  Angelina Lazarenko (RUS)
Best Setter
  Alessia Orro (ITA)
Best Outside Spikers
  Tutku Burcu Yüzgenç (TUR)
  Katarina Lazovic (SER)

Best Middle Blockers
  Angelina Lazarenko (RUS)
  Elizaveta Kotova (RUS)
Best Opposite Spiker
  Britt Herbots (BEL)
Best Libero
  Tijana Milojevic (SER)

See also
2015 Boys' Youth European Volleyball Championship

References

External links

Girls' Youth European Volleyball Championship
European Girls' Youth Championship
Volleyball
International volleyball competitions hosted by Bulgaria